Hedwig of Cieszyn (1469 – 6 April 1521) was a Polish princess.  She was the only child of Przemysław II, Duke of Cieszyn by his wife Anna, daughter of Duke Bolesław IV of Warsaw.

Life
After her father's death in 1477, eight-year-old Hedwig was placed under the guardianship of her cousin, Casimir II.

On 11 August 1483 she married the widower Stephen Zápolya, Lord of Trencsén (Trenčín). They had four children: János Zápolya (2 June 1487 – 22 July 1540), later King of Hungary; George Zápolya (ca. 1494 – 29 August 1526), killed in action at Mohács; Barbara Zápolya (1495 – 2 October 1515), Queen of Poland after her marriage to Sigismund I the Old; and Magdalena Zápolya (b. ca. 1499 – 1499), died young.

Stephen Zápolya died on 23 December 1499. Hedwig remained in Hungary, where she managed the huge property left behind by her late husband. She was also a generous supporter of the Carthusian monastery of Lapis Refugii in Spiš.

Hedwig died on 16 April 1521 in Trencsén Castle and was buried alongside her husband in the Zápolya family vault on the Szepes chapter house.

1469 births
1521 deaths
15th-century Polish people
16th-century Polish people
15th-century Hungarian people
16th-century Hungarian people
Piast dynasty
Hungarian people of Polish descent
Zápolya family
16th-century Polish women
16th-century Hungarian women